Jairo Ruiz Lopez (born 26 November 1988) is a Spanish Paralympic triathlete. He won a bronze medal at the 2016 Summer Paralympics in the Men's PT4.

References

External links 
 
 

1988 births
Living people
Sportspeople from Almería
Spanish male triathletes
Paratriathletes of Spain
Paralympic medalists in paratriathlon
Paralympic bronze medalists for Spain
Paratriathletes at the 2016 Summer Paralympics
Medalists at the 2016 Summer Paralympics